Infoman is a half-hour-long televised series satirizing the current events of Quebec, Canada, and the world hosted by Jean-René Dufort on Ici Radio-Canada Télé.

Production details 

Politicians, the hot-button issues in the news, and pop culture are the subjects of the show, presented with a clean sense of humor. The show is known for its irreverence towards federal politicians.

Originally airing at 7:30 on Fridays, the show moved to the Thursday slot at the beginning of 2006, then in 2007, Saturday at the same time. In its eighth season, Infoman returned to its Thursday time slot. Each week, Chantal Lamarre presents a five-minute segment wherein she complains about things which are sometimes relevant to the news. Journalist MC Gilles also has a column each week.

During the 2010 Gemini Awards, Infoman won 3 Geminis: best humor special, best comedy series, and best direction in a comedy series.

In fall 2017, Infoman presented its 18th season of the show.

External links
  Official site
 

Canadian news parodies
Ici Radio-Canada Télé original programming
Canadian Screen Award-winning television shows
2000s Canadian satirical television series
2010s Canadian satirical television series
2020s Canadian satirical television series